The Solomon Sea is a sea located within the Pacific Ocean. It lies between Papua New Guinea and Solomon Islands. Many major battles were fought there during World War II.

Extent
The International Hydrographic Organization defines the limits of the Solomon Sea as follows:

On the Northwest. By the Southeast limit of Bismarck Sea [A line from the Southern point of New Ireland along the parallel of 4°50' South to the coast of New Britain, along its Northern coast and thence a line from its Western extreme through the Northern point of Umboi Island to Teliata Point, New Guinea].

On the Northeast. By a line from the Southern point of New Ireland to the North point of Buka Island, through this island to the Northwest point of Bougainville Island, along the Southern coasts of Bougainville, Choisel [Choiseul], Ysabel [Santa Isabel], Malaita and San Cristobal [Makira] Islands.

On the South. The Northern limit of the Coral Sea between San Cristobal Island, the Solomon Islands, and Gado-Gadoa Island, off the Southeast extreme of New Guinea [Gado-Gadoa Island near its Southeastern extreme, down this meridian to the 100 fathom line and thence along the Southern edges of Uluma (Suckling) Reef and those extending to the Eastward as far as the Southeast point of Lawik Reef off Tagula Island [Vanatinai], thence a line to the Southern extreme of Rennell Island and from its Eastern point to Cape Surville, the Eastern extreme of San Cristobal Island].

On the Southwest. By the coast of New Guinea and a line from its Southeasternmost point through the Louisiade Archipelago to Rossel Island.

Deepest point
The Solomon Sea roughly corresponds with the Solomon Sea Plate, a tectonic feature, and includes the New Britain Trench, and reaches its maximum depth at 29,988 feet (9,140 m) below sea level in the Planet Deep.

References

External links

Marginal seas of the Pacific Ocean
Seas of Oceania
Bodies of water of Papua New Guinea
Bodies of water of the Solomon Islands
Geography of Milne Bay Province
Geography of New Britain
Geography of the Autonomous Region of Bougainville
Solomon Islands (archipelago)
Papua New Guinea–Solomon Islands border